Robach is a surname. Notable people with the surname include:

Amy Robach (born 1973), American television journalist
Joseph Robach (born 1958), American politician
Roger J. Robach (1934–1991), American politician
Rolf Robach (1885–1963), Norwegian gymnast